Raha Etemadi (born November 4, 1984) is an Iranian lyricist, producer, director, documentary producer and TV presenter, known for hosting talent shows Googoosh Music Academy and Stage on Manoto.

Career
While completing his university degree, he co-founded the first Iran online TV channel (www.bebin.tv) while working for the network Bebin TV. Following the success of Etemadi's work with this channel he then helped to launch a new TV/satellite channel: Manoto. The channel became an immediate success. Etemadi was among the most notable staff in the channel and worked with Manoto from the channel's launch in October 2010 until 2017.

References

Living people
Year of birth missing (living people)